James Montgomery Rice (March 8, 1842 – April 11, 1912) was an American soldier (Colonel), lawyer, and member of the Illinois House of Representatives who contributed to the establishment of the United States National Guard.

Early life 
Rice was born in Monmouth, Illinois, to George and Caroline (née Montgomery) Rice. He was named after his second great-grandfather, William Montgomery, whose vaunted military and political service was a major influence on his life.

American Civil War 
Following the First Battle of Bull Run, Rice left Monmouth College to enlist in the 10th Illinois Infantry Regiment. After three years of continuous service, which covered 1,000 marched miles and 13 battles, he was discharged on September 18, 1864.

Juris Doctor 
Rice completed a bachelor's degree at the University of Michigan followed by a Juris Doctor at Michigan Law. Following graduation, he went into practice with David McCulloch and was admitted to the Supreme Court of Illinois in 1867, followed by the Supreme Court of the United States in 1890. He practiced law for 31 years.

United States National Guard 

In 1875, Rice re-enlisted in the National Blues of the Illinois Militia. Recalling his experience in the American Civil War, Rice was concerned with the organizational structure, lack of standardization in leader qualifications and professional development, low levels of individual and unit training and readiness, and inadequate uniforms and equipment. He began advocating for federal involvement and became the first chairman of the Committee on Legislation of the National Guard Association of Illinois in 1883. He authored dozens of articles over the ensuing years including most notably:

 1888, Military Education and the Volunteer Militia
 1894, The National Guard—What It is and Its Use
 1896, The Defense of our Frontier
 1896, The Present Congress and the National Guard
 Notable excerpt: “The National Guard, if rightly fostered and improved, will be a very efficient and economical force to be used for almost any purpose and at any place where a force may be needed by either the state or the nation.”
 1901, Field Service Instruction and the National Guard Officer
 1904, The New National Guard

His articles were circulated nationwide and caught the attention of the National Guard Association of the United States. He joined the executive staff in 1890 alongside Charles Dick who would become president in 1902 and sponsor the Militia Act of 1903, officially establishing the United States National Guard.

In 1892, Rice authored the Range Manual and Score Record and Small Arms Practice for National Guard, which are adopted as doctrine nationwide.

Other civic service 
During the golden age of fraternalism, Rice assisted in organizing the Grand Army of the Republic Bryner Post #67 in Peoria, Illinois. In 1879 he was nominated the first adjutant and served on the national staff from 1894 to 1896. In 1896 his mother, Caroline, established the Peoria chapter Daughters of the American Revolution, honoring her great-grandfather William Montgomery.

In 1897, Rice was endorsed by the Illinois Republican Party and National Guard Association of the United States for United States Assistant Secretary of War, however George de Rue Meiklejohn won the nomination.

In 1901, Rice authored the "Peoria Overture Plan" which profoundly effected corruption and reorganization of the Presbyterian Church.

References 

1842 births
1912 deaths
People from Monmouth, Illinois
People of Illinois in the American Civil War
Monmouth College alumni
University of Michigan alumni
Illinois National Guard personnel
Illinois lawyers
Republican Party members of the Illinois House of Representatives
19th-century American lawyers
Grand Army of the Republic officials